Arizona Grace Muse (born September 18, 1988) is an American fashion model.

Early life
Muse was born in Tucson, Arizona, and raised in Santa Fe, New Mexico. Her father is American and her mother is British.

Career 
Muse began modeling as a teenager but her career did not begin until 2009.

Muse has appeared in editorials in French, American, Chinese, British, Korean, Spanish, Portuguese, Russian, and Italian Vogue, W, V, Numéro, and Dazed & Confused. The March 2011 issue of Dazed & Confused was dedicated to her.

Muse has appeared on the cover of the Chinese, Australian, Spanish, Greek, Korean, Mexican, Portuguese, Russian, Turkish and Ukrainian Vogue and Numéro (shot by Karl Lagerfeld), and Dazed & Confused. She appeared on the November 2011 cover of Vogue Paris (shot by Inez van Lamsweerde and Vinoodh Matadin).

In 2013 she appeared in a Louis Vuitton ad along with David Bowie.

Personal life
Muse has a son named Nikko Quintana Muse (born April 14, 2009), with ex-fiancé Manuel Quintana. She married Boniface Verney-Carron in London in 2017. Their daughter was born in 2018.

References 

1988 births
Living people
21st-century American women
American people of English descent
Female models from New Mexico
Next Management models
People from Tucson, Arizona
People from Santa Fe, New Mexico
Prada exclusive models